Sasson Dayan is a Lebanese-born Brazilian banker and co-founder of Banco Daycoval.

Biography
Sasson was born on April 1, 1940 in Lebanon to a Jewish family where he worked at Casa Bancária Salim A. Dayan, a bank founded by his father. In the 1950s, he immigrated to Brazil. In 1958, he and his brother Ibrahim Dayan co-founded the stock brokerage Daycoval DTVM Ltda. In 1970, they founded Valco Corretora de Valores Ltda. In 1989, they received government approval to convert  Daycoval DTVM Ltda into Banco Daycoval which specializes in lending to medium size companies.

His son  is married to Esther Safra Dayan, daughter of Vicky and Joseph Safra. Per Forbes Magazine as of September 2014, he was worth 1.6 billion Brazilian Reais ($709 million US dollars).

References

Living people
1940 births
Lebanese Jews
Brazilian Sephardi Jews
20th-century Sephardi Jews
21st-century Sephardi Jews
Brazilian bankers
Brazilian billionaires
Lebanese emigrants to Brazil
Brazilian people of Lebanese-Jewish descent
Safra family